Benjamin James Davis (born 24 November 2000) is a Thai professional footballer who plays for Thai side Port, on loan from League One club Oxford United. He has played for the Thailand under-23 team.

Club career
Davis started his professional career training at JSSL Singapore, a youth soccer academy owned by his father based in Singapore that has partnerships with Fulham and Singapore Premier League side Tampines Rovers. He later joined the Football Association of Singapore's (FAS) Junior Centre of Excellence, and went on to represent various national age group teams.

In 2017, Davis earned a two-year academy scholarship with Fulham after impressing in trials. He was the first ever Singaporean player to sign for a Premier League side.

In his first season, Davis made 10 appearances for the club's under-18 South League team, scoring a header against West Ham's Under-18 side and recording a passing accuracy of 90 percent. In 2018, Fulham announced that Davis, alongside other academy players, were offered professional contracts, where they would now earn a weekly wage as well as continue to play for the club's Under-18 and Under-23 side. He signed his first professional Fulham contract in June 2017 and is listed on the club's website as an English national. On 13 October 2019, Davis confirmed that he had registered to play as a local player with the English Football Association.

Oxford United
On 31 August 2021, Davis joined League One side Oxford United on a two-year deal. In August 2022 he was sent on a season-long loan to Thai club Port F.C.

International career
Davis currently holds passports from the United Kingdom, Thailand, and Singapore but represents Thailand internationally.

During his training stint with JSSL Singapore and FAS Junior Centre of Excellence, Davis represented Singapore in several 2016 AFC U-16 Championship qualifiers in 2015. In 2017, Davis earned a call-up to Singapore's under-19 side to play in several 2018 AFC Under-19 Championship qualifiers.

In 2018, Davis received a surprise call-up to the senior Singapore national team for a run of AFC Asian Cup qualifiers, but he did not play in any of the matches.

In September 2019, Davis was called up to the Thailand under-23 national team for the SEA Games training camp.

In 2020, Davis represented Thailand at the 2020 AFC U-23 Championship, appearing in a 1–1 draw against Iraq in the group stage as well as a 1–0 loss to Saudi Arabia in the quarter final, cap-tying him to Thailand. In 2022, he was called up to the U23 team for the 2022 AFC U-23 Asian Cup.

Personal life 
Davis was born in Phuket, Thailand, and migrated to Singapore at the age of five with his family. Davis studied at the Singapore Sports School from 2013 to 2015 before moving to London's Harrow High School in 2016. In 2017, he was awarded a two-year scholarship with Fulham's academy.

Davis is the second-youngest of four children. His mother, Sopee Davis, is Thai, while his father, Harvey Davis, is English.

National service evasion 
As a Singaporean citizen, Davis was to be conscripted under the city-state's national service scheme upon turning 18. His application for deferment to develop his professional career as a footballer with Fulham was rejected by the Ministry of Defence (MINDEF) as he did "not meet the criteria for long-term deferment from full-time NS". His father drew parallels to Joseph Schooling, a national swimmer who was granted deferment and went on to win Olympic medals.

MINDEF countered that Davis' contract with Fulham was no different from other pre-enlistees' personal pursuits and a further appeal supported by the Football Association of Singapore (FAS) was also denied. The ministry also said that Davis did not meet the criteria for long-term deferment due to it being a personal pursuit, and that it was unfair to other pre-enlistees who served their NS commitments. It further added that the deferment rejection was also based on grounds that Davis' father "would not commit to a date" on when his son would return to Singapore to serve NS, coupled with subsequent remarks to the media that he would encourage his son to renounce his Singapore citizenship in order to pursue his career.

On 11 January 2019, Davis failed to report for national service and since 18 February 2019 has been deemed as a defaulter. While the FAS had previously supported Davis' deferment application, they condemned his decision to not return. In October 2019, Davis eventually chose to represent Thailand and declared he would not return to Singapore despite being a citizen, and had no intentions to fulfill his national service obligations.

International statistics

Singapore under-16 international caps

Singapore under-19 international caps

Thailand under-23 international caps

International goals

Honours
Thailand U-23
 Southeast Asian Games  Silver medal: 2021

References

External links

2000 births
Living people
Ben Davis
Ben Davis
Ben Davis
Singaporean footballers
Ben Davis
Singaporean people of Thai descent
Singaporean people of English descent
Naturalised citizens of Singapore
Association football midfielders
Thai expatriate sportspeople in England
Fulham F.C. players
Oxford United F.C. players
Ben Davis
Competitors at the 2021 Southeast Asian Games
Southeast Asian Games medalists in football
Ben Davis